The 2005 UAB Blazers football team represented the University of Alabama at Birmingham (UAB) in the 2005 NCAA Division I-A football season and was the 15th team fielded by the school. The Blazers' head coach was Watson Brown, who served his 11th season in the positions. They played their home games at Legion Field in Birmingham, Alabama, and competed as a member of Conference USA. The Blazers finished their tenth season at the I-A level, and seventh affiliated with a conference with a record of 5–6 (3–5 C-USA).

Schedule

References

UAB
UAB Blazers football seasons
UAB Blazers football